Dreams Come True is a 1936 British musical film directed by Reginald Denham and starring Frances Day, Nelson Keys and Hugh Wakefield. The film is based on the 1924 operetta Clo-Clo by Franz Lehár and Bela Jenbach in an English adaptation by Bruce Sievier. It was made at Ealing Studios. It was one of many operetta films made during the decade.

Cast
 Frances Day as Ilona Ratkay 
 Nelson Keys as Anton 
 Hugh Wakefield as Albert von Waldenau 
 Marie Lohr as Helen von Waldenau 
 Frederick Bradshaw as Peter 
 Morris Harvey as Waldemar 
 Arthur Finn as Manager 
 Minnie Rayner as Dresser

See also
 The World's in Love (1935)

References

Bibliography
 Low, Rachael. Filmmaking in 1930s Britain. George Allen & Unwin, 1985.
 Wood, Linda. British Films, 1927-1939. British Film Institute, 1986.

External links

1936 films
British musical films
British black-and-white films
1936 musical films
Films directed by Reginald Denham
Ealing Studios films
Operetta films
Films based on operettas
Films set in Vienna
Remakes of Austrian films
1930s English-language films
1930s British films